KTCS may refer to:

 KTCS (AM), a radio station (1410 AM) licensed to Fort Smith, Arkansas, United States
 KTCS-FM, a radio station (99.9 FM) licensed to Fort Smith, Arkansas, United States
 the ICAO code for Truth or Consequences Municipal Airport